Murder 101 is a 1991 American mystery thriller television film directed by Bill Condon, who co-wrote it with Roy Johansen. The film stars Pierce Brosnan, Dey Young, Antoni Corone, Todd Merrill and Dianne Hull. It also stars Raphael Sbarge and Kathe Mazur. It aired on the USA Network on March 20, 1991.

Plot
Charles Lattimore, an English professor played by Brosnan, gives his class an assignment to plot a murder, but after a student and someone else dies, he becomes the prime suspect in a murder investigation. Realizing that the theoretical murder plot has been used to set him up, he is faced with finding a way to foil the plan he helped create.

Cast
Pierce Brosnan as Charles Lattimore
Dey Young as Laura Lattimore
Kim Thomson as Francesca Lavin
Antoni Corone as Mike Dowling
Raphael Sbarge as Robert Miner
J. Kenneth Campbell as Tim Ryder
Yorgo Constantine as Jon Steinmetz
Judy Prescott as Gail Gogerty
Dianne Hull as Ellen Dowling	
Terry Markwell as Anne Ryder
Bob Sweeney as Tilden Crane
Mark L. Taylor as Henry Potter
Barbara Allyne Bennet as Judge 
Jack Thibeau as Roadblock Officer
Kathe Mazur as Linda Jo, Poet
Todd Merrill as John Defazio
Mary Lou Piccard as TV Reporter
Janet Rotblatt as Millie
Suzanne Stone as Defense Attorney
Yavone Evans as Mary
Tim Neeley as Deputy Sheriff

Release

VHS
 Universal City, CA : MCA Universal Home Video (1992)

DVD
 Timeless Media Group (circa 2007)
 Goodtimes Home Video (© 2000)

References

External links
 

1991 television films
1991 films
1991 thriller films
1990s American films
1990s English-language films
1990s mystery thriller films
American mystery thriller films
American thriller television films
Films about educators
Films about murder
Films directed by Bill Condon
Films with screenplays by Bill Condon
USA Network original films